The Missionaries of the Company of Mary is a missionary religious congregation within the Catholic Church. The community was founded by Saint Louis de Montfort in 1705 with the recruitment of his first missionary disciple, Mathurin Rangeard. The congregation is made up of priests and brothers who serve both in the native lands and in other countries. The Montfortian Family comprises three groups: the Company of Mary, the Daughters of Wisdom and the Brothers of Saint Gabriel.

History
As early as 1700 Montfort had conceived the idea of founding a society of missionaries. Five months after his ordination, in November 1700, Montfort wrote: "I am continually asking in my prayers for a poor and small company of good priests to preach missions and retreats under the standard and protection of the Blessed Virgin".

In 1713 he went to Paris with a view to recruit members for his community. The director of the seminary Du St-Esprit promised to send him such young priests as would feel called to do missionary work. During the intervals between his missions Montfort wrote the Rule of the Company of Mary though no official membership would develop before his death. After de Montfort died in 1716, two young priests and occasional collaborators, Father Adrien Vatel and Father Rene Mulot continued his mission. From 1718 to 1781 the "Mulotins", although few in number, gave over 430 missions throughout western France, most of which lasted a month.

After the French Revolution Montfort's community was reorganised by Father Gabriel Deshayes, elected superior general in 1821. He received from Pope Leo XII a brief of praise for the Company of Mary and for the Daughters of Wisdom, which had also been formed by de Montfort with the help of Blessed Marie Louise Trichet. Father Dalin who was superior general from 1837 to 1855, obtained canonical approbation of both congregations. Hitherto the missionaries had but one residence, the mother-house at Saint-Laurent-sur-Sèvre (where de Montfort and Trichet are buried) in the Pays de la Loire region. During Dalin's administration as general, several establishments were made in France. Under his successor, Father Denis (1855–1877) the community accepted the direction of a seminary at Pontchâteau in the Diocese of Nantes, from where priests were sent to Haiti, the company's first attempt at foreign missions.

The anti-clerical sentiment which arose in the French government in the late 19th century, resulted in the enacting of the Jules Ferry laws which led to many religious congregations which operated schools to leave France. The Montfortian novices took refuge in the Netherlands, where a novitiate and a scholasticate were established. In 1883, a school was also begun at Schimmert. That same year saw the establishment of the first house in Canada. The beatification of de Montfort, in 1888, gave a new stimulus to the company's expansion. A novitiate and a scholasticate were founded near Ottawa (1890); a mission school at Papineauville, Quebec (1900) and missions in Denmark. In 1901 the company took charge of what was then the Apostolic vicariate of Nyassa Land (Malawi) where the congregation ministers to this day.
The 20th century witnessed the expansion of the company throughout the world, and its members now serve on every continent.

Mission and charism
The mission of the Company of Mary is expressed in the Congregation's Constitutions as follows:"Our Mission in the Church consists in revealing the mystery of salvation to those who do not yet know it, and in helping those who have already heard the Good News to rediscover and deepen this mystery by a renewed consciousness of the meaning of their baptismal commitment."
"The Marian character of the Company is an essential possession of our Congregation. Mary is not present in the life of the missionaries in some accidental fashion: devotion toward her is an integral part of their spiritual life and apostolate. The 'total consecration' to Jesus through Mary is the most outstanding mark of the Marian character of our inspiration."

Vows

As members of a religious congregation Montfortians embrace the evangelical counsels, taking the three traditional religious vows of poverty, chastity and obedience. Poverty means that all possessions are held in common and that no member may accumulate wealth. Chastity means more than abstaining from sexual activity and its purpose is to make the religious totally available for service; it is also a sign that only God can completely fill the human heart. For a member of a religious congregation, obedience is not slavishly doing what one is told by the superior but being attentive to God's will by prayerfully listening to the voice of the person in charge. Ultimately, these vows are lived out within a community and bolstered by a relationship with God.

Religious Formation

Enquiry and discernment

As part of this discernment process it is normal for interested parties to spend weekends, or even longer, in a Montfortian community. During this time the members of the Congregation share what it is like to be a priest, religious brother or sister. The young people are also strongly encouraged to attend Mass as often as possible and to regularly spend time in prayer in order to better discern their vocation.

Postulancy

This period which lasts between six months to a year, and postulants live in a community on a full-time basis. This postulancy is devoted to learning more deeply about what it means to follow Christ as a future Montfort. It is normal for the postulant to study French if he has no, or limited, knowledge of the language.

Novitiate

Once the candidate knows the Montfortian way of life, he is admitted into the novitiate preparing himself to take the vows of poverty, chastity and obedience. The novitiate year is crucial, for it is then that the novices“...better understand their divine vocation, and indeed one which is proper to the institute, experience the manner of living of the institute, and form their mind and heart in its spirit, and so that their intention and suitability are tested.”  Thus, the novices are given the opportunity for longer periods of prayer and spiritual reading as well as silence in order to reflect on the vocation God is offering and nature of their response. The spiritual development of the novice is of particular focus, especially through spiritual direction. During the novitiate the history and Constitutions of the Congregation are studied in depth.

A simple profession is made at the end of the novitiate and the person officially becomes a member of the Congregation for “By religious profession, members assume the observance of the three evangelical counsels by public vow, are consecrated to God through the ministry of the Church, and are incorporated into the institute with the rights and duties defined by law.”As part of the ceremony, the new member is clothed in the Montfortian habit which consists of a fold-over black cassock, cord from which hang a 15 decade set of rosary beads.

Post Novitiate

Post novitiate is where the newly professed religious deepens his commitment as a member of the Montfortians and decides whether or not to make a lifelong commitment to vowed life. For those with a vocation to be a brother suitable training is pursued in his particular field of interest. It is normal for a brother to make his perpetual profession to the Congregation after 3 or 4 years. The Company of Mary asserts that The Brothers in particular enrich the Mission with their talents as builders especially, as agriculturists, secretaries, leaders in catechesis and in liturgy: services that they continue to offer with the help of the computer and the internet.

Those called to Holy Orders study for a degree in theology, taking courses in philosophy if they have no experience of that discipline. At the end of this period of formation, which, according to Canon Law, may last between 3 and 6 years perpetual profession (final vows) is made and ordination to the diaconate follows and then to the presbyterate between six months and a year later. In exceptional circumstances, temporary vows may be extended beyond the 6-year period, but for no more than 3 years.

Structure
As with all religious congregations in the Latin branch of the Catholic Church, the Montfortians are led by a superior general who is assisted by his council. The general calls a general chapter according to the constitutions of the company and it is this convocation (composed of elected members from around the world) which sets goals, establishes provinces and sets policy. There are provinces, vice-provinces and delegations each of which is led by a provincial (or someone similar) elected by those members who have taken final vows.

Communities
 Belgium Vice-province: Marian apostolate, parishes, mission in Democratic Republic of Congo
 Canada Vice-province: parishes in Quebec, retreats, Marian shrine in Montreal and parish missions
 Colombia Province: seminary in Bogota, parishes and a mission in the Vichada region
 France Province: parishes, missions in Argentina and Spain from where Spanish members have gone to Ecuador, missions in the Bahamas, Haiti, Réunion and Madagascar
 Germany General delegation: parishes, teaching, religious publications
 India Delegation: formation houses, education, tribal peoples, justice and peace
 Indonesia Vice-province: indigenous peoples, those affected by HIV, education
 Italy Province: parishes, retreats, parochial missions, publishing, missions in Madagascar, Malawi, Peru and Zambia
 Netherlands Province: missions in Brazil, Indonesia and Uganda, 3 parishes in Denmark with a presence in Mozambique
 Papua New Guinea Province (staffed solely by brothers and sisters): education, health care, those affected by HIV
 The Philippines General delegation: parish, rural communities on Cebu
 Portugal General delegation: parishes and international shrine of Our Lady of Fatima	
 United Kingdom Vice-province: parish missions, retreats, immigrants, missions in Malawi and Uganda (where the work is primarily with those affected by AIDS
 The United States Province: parishes, retreats, parish missions, publishing of religious periodicals, missionary work in Nicaragua

See also
Saint Louis de Montfort
Daughters of Wisdom

References

External links
 Montfort publications
 Generalate website
 Montfortian Brothers in India 
 Philippines Delegation
 United Kingdom Vice-province
 US Province
 Montfortian spirituality website
 Montfort Brothers of Saint Gabriel
 Daughters of Wisdom

1705 establishments in France
Catholic orders and societies
Catholic spirituality